The United States Virgin Islands first competed at the Olympic Games in 1968, and have since sent athletes to compete at every Summer Olympic Games except in 1980, when they took part in the boycott to the Moscow Games. They have also participated in seven Olympic Winter Games since 1988, having only missed the 2010 Winter Olympics. The only Olympic medal won by a Virgin Islander was a silver by Peter Holmberg in sailing at the 1988 Summer Olympics.

The Virgin Islands Olympic Committee was formed in 1967 and recognized by the International Olympic Committee the same year.

Medal tables

Medals by Summer Games

Medals by Winter Games

Medals by sport

List of medalists

See also
 Tropical nations at the Winter Olympics
 List of flag bearers for the Virgin Islands at the Olympics
 Virgin Islands at the Paralympics
 Virgin Islands at the Pan American Games

External links
 
 
 

 
Olympics